Gaël Aymon is an author, screenwriter, film director and producer born in Paris, France.

Having attended the acting schools of Les Cours Florent and the Studio Pygmalion, Gael Aymon first embarks on a career in acting and directing.
He has worked as a producer and distributor for the cinema and theatre.

He was first published as a children's author in 2010. His books have received numerous awards and have been translated into Chinese, Korean, Romanian, Italian, Spanish (Spain and Mexico), Catalan, German and Portuguese (Brasil).

In 2023, he is one of the nominees for the International Astrid Lindgren Memorial Award.

Books

For teenagers and young adults 
 L'apprenti-conteur (L'Ecole des loisirs - Novel - 2022)
 Grim, fils du marais (Nathan - Novel - 2021)
 Silent Boy (Nathan - Novel - 2020)
 Et ta vie m'appartiendra (Nathan - Novel - 2020)
 Mon ame frere (Actes Sud Junior - Novel- 2018)
 La planete des 7 Dormants (Nathan - Novel - 2018)
 Golden Valley (Gallimard Jeunesse - Novel - 2016)
 The forgotten heroes - Volume II "The Masters" (Actes Sud Junior - Novel- 2016)
 The forgotten heroes - Volume I "The gates of oblivion" (Actes Sud Junior - Novel- 2015)
 Forgetting Camille (Actes Sud Junior - Novel - Rentrée littéraire 2014)
 Ma reputation (Actes Sud Junior – Novel – 2013)

For children 
 Vraiment peur! (Nathan - 2022)
 SOS petites sirenes - Volume I to VI (Nathan - 2021-2022)
 Sleeping Beauty (Nathan - 2020)
 Les grandes annees - Volume VIII (Nathan - 2020)
 La Belle et la Bete aux larmes de diamants (Gautier-Languereau - 2019)
 Les grandes annees - Volume VI & VII (Nathan - 2019)
 Les grandes annees - Volume III, IV & V (Nathan - 2018)
 Snow White (Nathan - 2018)
 Les grandes annees - Volume I & II (Nathan - 2017)
 Le conte des trois flocons (Bayard Editions - J'aime Lire poche - 2015)
 Perce-Neige et les trois ogresses (Éditions Talents Hauts - 2014) – supported by Amnesty International
 Le secret le plus fort du monde (Les éditions du Ricochet – 2014)
 The son of the giants ("Le fils des géants" – Éditions Talents Hauts – 2013) – supported by Amnesty International
 Scarlet Slippers ("Les souliers écarlates" – Éditions Talents Hauts – 2012) – supported by Amnesty International
 An Upside Down Birthday ("L'anniversaire à l'envers" – Éditions Talents Hauts – 2012)
 Tales of Another Type ("Contes d'un autre genre" – Éditions Talents Hauts – 2011)
 Giga-Boy (Éditions Talents Hauts – 2011))
 A Space in the Playground ("Une place dans la cour" – Éditions Talents Hauts- 2011)
 Princess Candy-Floss ("La princesse Rose-praline" – Éditions Talents Hauts- 2010)

Prizes 
Full list here : http://gaelaymon.com/ressources/

Gael Aymon was nominated for the 2023 International Astrid Lindgren Memorial Award

Silent Boy
Prix Louis Mathis 2021

Et ta vie m'appartiendra
Prix Lire Elire 2021

Oublier Camille
Programme 2016 de l’Éducation Nationale, lectures cursives jeunesse, classes de 4e, « Dire l’amour, dire l’absence »
Prix littéraire Au cœur des page, Nort-sur-Erdre 2019
Prix des collégiens de Clamart 2016

Ma réputation

Prix littéraire Marguerite-Bahuet 2017
Prix littéraire "slam ta lecture " 2017
Prix de la ville Cherbourg-Octeville 2015
Prix Gr’Aisne de critique 2014-2015
Prix Jacaranda 2016 (Maroc)

Perce-Neige et les trois ogresses
Prix Littéraire du Val de l'Aurence 2016

Une place dans la cour
Prix Tartines Fraises 2013

External links
 Gaël Aymon's official Website
 Gael Aymon on Facebook
 Gael Aymon on Instagram

French children's writers
21st-century French non-fiction writers
French film directors
French film producers
French male screenwriters
Living people
1973 births
21st-century French screenwriters